Bright Anukani (born 26 June 2000) is a Ugandan footballer who plays as a midfielder for KCCA and the Uganda national football team.

Club career
He joined KCCA in summer 2020.

References

Living people
2000 births
Sportspeople from Kampala
Ugandan footballers
Association football midfielders
Proline FC players
Uganda international footballers
Uganda A' international footballers
2020 African Nations Championship players
Kampala Capital City Authority FC players
2022 African Nations Championship players